
The 11th SS Panzer Army (SS-Panzer-Armeeoberkommando 11) was little more than a paper army formed in February 1945 by Heinrich Himmler while he was commander of Army Group Vistula.

Military historian Antony Beevor writes that when the 11th SS Panzer Army was created the available units at best could constitute a corps, "'But panzer army' observed Hans-Georg Eismann 'has a better ring to it'". It also allowed Himmler to promote SS officers to senior staff and field commands within the formation. Obergruppenführer Felix Steiner was named its commander. The army was officially listed as the 11th Army but it was also known as SS Panzer-Armeeoberkommando 11 and is often referred to in English as the 11th SS Panzer Army.

After taking part in Operation Solstice east of the Oder River in February 1945, the army was assigned to OB West and reorganized in March 1945. Many of the units formerly subordinated to the 11th SS Panzer Army were transferred to the 3rd Panzer Army and other units were assigned to the 11th Army for operations against the Western Allies. After defending the Weser River and the Harz Mountains, the 11th surrendered to the Western Allies on 21 April.

Orders of battle

February 1945
By 5 February the 11th SS Panzer Army, subordinated to Army Group Vistula, had the following units assigned to it:

 Tettau Corps Group:
 Köslin
 Bärwalde
 X SS Corps
  5th Jäger-Division
 Division Nr 402
 Munzel Corps Group:
  Führer Grenadier Division
  Führer Escort Division
 III (Germanic) SS Panzer Corps:
 281st Infantry Division
  23rd SS Volunteer Panzergrenadier Division Nederland
 Division Voigt
  11th SS Volunteer Panzergrenadier Division Nordland
  27th SS Volunteer Grenadier Division Langemarck
 XXXIX Panzer Corps
  4th SS Polizei Panzergrenadier Division
  10th SS Panzer Division Frundsberg
  28th SS Volunteer Grenadier Division Wallonien
 Panzer Division Holstein
 HQ, Wehrkreis II as corps-level field command (stellv. II):
 Swinemünde Defensive Region
Division Deneke
  9th Parachute Division
Direct army command
  163rd Infantry Division

March 1945
By 1 March the 11th SS Panzer Army, subordinated to Army Group Vistula, had no units assigned to it.

April 1945
By 12 April the 11th SS Panzer Army was directly subordinated to OB West and had the following units assigned to it.

 LXVII Army Corps:
 Kampfgruppe Fellner
 Division Ettner
 Division Heidenreich
 Division Grosskreuz
 Stellv. IX:
  26th Volksgrenadier Division
 326th Volksgrenadier Division
 LXVI Army Corps:
  277th Volksgrenadier Division
 SS Brigade Westfalen
  9th Panzer Division
  116th Panzer Division

See also
 11th Army, the official German Army name for the army. The 11th Army also existed before this last reincarnation as an army that fought on the Eastern Front earlier in the war.
 Army Detachment Steiner fought in the Battle of Berlin, and because Steiner commanded that paper army it can easily be confused with the 11th SS Panzer Army.

References
 Tessin,  Georg. Verbände und Truppen der deutschen Wehrmacht und Waffen-SS 1939 - 1945 Volume 3
 Beevor, Antony. Berlin: The Downfall 1945, Penguin Books, 2002,

Footnotes

Military units and formations of the Waffen-SS
Field armies of Germany in World War II
Military units and formations established in 1944
Military units and formations disestablished in 1945